In legislatures, a hemicycle is a semicircular, or horseshoe-shaped, debating chamber (plenary chamber), where deputies (members) sit to discuss and pass legislation. Although originally of Ancient Greek roots, the term and modern design derive from French politics and practice.

Usage
The circular shape is designed to encourage consensus among political parties rather than confrontation, such as in the Palace of Westminster, where the government and opposition parties face each other on opposing sets of benches. The design is used in most European countries (and hence was adopted by the European Parliament) and the United States.

The United Kingdom, which is the originator of the Westminster system, does not use a hemicycle. However, two of the three devolved legislatures, the Scottish Parliament and Senedd (Welsh Parliament), do use hemicycles; the Northern Ireland Assembly does not use a hemicycle format, but instead uses a "horseshoe" format, a hybrid of both the hemicycle and confrontational formats.

Arrangement
In the case of Australia (pictured below), the two largest parties still face each other, whereas in the Scottish Parliament's hemicycle, the largest party sits in the middle. However, some hemicycles follow a strict left-right arrangement with, for example, a left wing governing party sitting on the left and the right wing opposition on the right. In these cases election results are often portrayed in the hemicycle to show the results of left wing or right wing coalitions (reaching 50% in the centre, where centrist third parties are located) for the formation of a majority.

Alternative variations
Some Westminster-system countries outside the UK, such as India, New Zealand and Australia, have confrontational benches, but the end segment is curved to create a partial hemicycle, while other countries, such as the People's Republic of China, have a single set of benches facing towards a stage area (which reflects the one-party system in operation there).

Gallery

See also

 
Debate chamber
Parliament diagram

References

Legislatures
Architectural elements
Buildings and structures by shape